Cannero Riviera ([càn-ne-ro]; in Western Lombard Càner), is a comune (an Italian municipality) with a population of 973 and an area of 
in the Province of Verbano-Cusio-Ossola in the Italian region of Piedmont.

Cannero Riviera borders the following municipalities: Aurano, Cannobio, Oggebbio, Trarego Viggiona; and across the lake in the Lombard Province of Varese: Brezzo di Bedero,  Germignaga, Luino.

The 19th-century politician Massimo D’Azeglio spent his last years in his villa here.

See also

Castelli di Cannero

Demographic evolution

Minorities of foreign residents 
 ISTAT data recorded on January 1, 2011, show that there were 107 foreign residents, as follows:

 Greek 42
 German 27
 Bangladeshi 16
 Brazilian 10
 Others 12

References
 Most demographics and other statistics sourced from the Italian statistical institute Istat.

External links
 www.cannero.it/
 Official Tourism Gateway Lake Maggiore Official Tourism Gateway
 Cannero Riviera

Cities and towns in Piedmont